Qian Xuan (1235–1305), courtesy name Shun Ju (舜举), pseudonyms Yu Tan (玉潭, "Jade Pool"), Xi Lanweng (习嬾翁), and Zha Chuanweng (霅川翁), was a Chinese painter from Huzhou (湖州), the present day Wuxing District in Zhejiang. He lived during the late Song dynasty and early Yuan dynasty.

Biography 
Qian Xuan started as an aspiring scholar-official during the rule of the Southern Song (960–1279). However, he had difficulty climbing the ranks of officialdom. When the Mongol-founded Yuan Dynasty took over the southern regions of China in 1276, he effectively gave up on the idea of a career in civil administration. In 1286, his friend Zhao Mengfu found and accepted a position there, and so for a time it seemed he could as well. However, he refused on patriotic grounds, while he cited old age to avoid difficulties. He nevertheless was considered a Song loyalist.

His life after 1276 was devoted to painting, and he became noted as a "fur and feathers" painter. He was also adept at bird-and-flower painting, character painting, and landscape painting (shan shui). He is known for landscapes that hinted at a longing for a return of native Chinese rule, such as in the work Home Again. He mixed Song realism with an archaic Tang style.

Works

Notes

References 
Masterpieces of Chinese Art (page 87), by Rhonda and Jeffrey Cooper, Todtri Productions, 1997. 
Ci hai bian ji wei yuan hui (辞海编辑委员会). Ci hai (辞海). Shanghai: Shanghai ci shu chu ban she (上海辞书出版社), 1979.

External links 

Qian Xuan and his Painting Gallery at China Online Museum
Museum of Fine Arts in Boston with three of his paintings
Early Autumn
Sung and Yuan paintings, an exhibition catalog from The Metropolitan Museum of Art Libraries (fully available online as PDF), which contains material on Qian Xuan (see list of paintings)

1235 births
1305 deaths
13th-century Chinese painters
14th-century Chinese painters
Painters from Zhejiang
People from Huzhou
Song dynasty painters
Yuan dynasty painters